Ilyobacter insuetus is a mesophilic and anaerobic bacterium from the genus of Ilyobacter which has been isolated from marine anoxic sediments from Venice in Italy.

References

Fusobacteriota
Bacteria described in 2002